Ukkali  is a village in the southern state of Karnataka, India. It is located in the Basavana Bagevadi taluk of Bijapur district in Karnataka.

Demographics
 India census, Ukkali had a population of 7707 with 3940 males and 3767 females.

See also
 Bijapur district
 Districts of Karnataka

References

External links
 http://Bijapur.nic.in/

Villages in Bijapur district, Karnataka